Spanish Valley is a flat in Grand and San Juan counties in Utah, United States, south of Moab.

Description
Pack Creek flows through Spanish Valley north northwestward into Moab Valley toward its confluence with the Colorado River.

History
The Old Spanish Trail passed through Spanish Valley on its way to its Colorado River crossing at what is now Moab.

See also

 List of valleys of Utah

References

External links

Valleys of Utah
Old Spanish Trail (trade route)
Landforms of Grand County, Utah
Landforms of San Juan County, Utah